People's Climate March may refer to:

 2014 People's Climate March, an activist event in New York City and elsewhere
 2017 People's Climate March, a protest in Washington, D.C., and elsewhere

See also
 Global Climate March, 2015
 List of environmental protests